Madison Elementary School was an elementary school in Winona, Minnesota, United States.  The building was constructed in 1932, the third of five new facilities built by Winona Public Schools in the early 20th century.  It was listed on the National Register of Historic Places in 2012 for its local significance in the theme of education.  It was nominated for representing the efforts of Winona Public Schools to implement progressive educational reforms such as separated grades, kindergartens, gymnasiums, art and music classrooms, and improved hygiene and fire safety.

Due to budgetary shortfalls, the school building was sold to a private buyer in 2018.

See also
 National Register of Historic Places listings in Winona County, Minnesota

References

1932 establishments in Minnesota
Buildings and structures in Winona, Minnesota
Gothic Revival architecture in Minnesota
National Register of Historic Places in Winona County, Minnesota
Public elementary schools in Minnesota
School buildings completed in 1932
School buildings on the National Register of Historic Places in Minnesota
Schools in Winona County, Minnesota